The Yakurr (also Yakö and Yakạạ) live in five compact towns in Cross River State (Obono 2001, p. 3), Nigeria. They were formally known as Umor, Ekoli, Ilomi, Nkoibolokom and Yakurr be Ibe.  Due to linguistic problems encountered by the early European visitors, the settlements have come to be known by their mispronounced versions – Ugep, Ekori, Idomi, Nko and Mkpani (Okoi-Uyouyo 2002).  In the latter, it is a product of yakpanikpani (a Lokạạ word for "tricks"), a name, which Enang (1980) says was given to them by the Ugep people after being tricked in a conflict (Yakurr News).

Territory

They are found in the present-day Yakurr Local Government Area and constitute the largest ethnic group in the state. They share their northern and eastern boundaries with the Assiga, Nyima and Agoi Clans of the Yakurr Local Government Area, the southern boundary with the Biase Local Government Area and their western boundary with the Abi Local Government Area.

By 1935, Yakurr had a population of 22,000 and 38,000 by 1953 (1939, 1950, and 1964; Hansford et al. 1976; and Crabb 1969).  The population numbers of Yakurr based on the 1991 national census were rejected by the local and state government due to discrepancies. The results of the 2006 census by the Nigerian government about the current population are still pending.

Origins
The language spoken by the Yakurr is Lokạạ, an Upper Cross River language. It is described by Iwara (1988) as one of the major languages of Cross River State, comparable, in terms of number of speakers, with Efik, which enjoys the special status of a lingua franca in the state. According to Ethnologue, it was spoken by 120.000 people in 1989 (Eberhard et al. 2019).

The Yakurr exhibits a very high degree of social heterogeneity, but linguistic, political, religious and cultural homogeneity. In the absence of written records, linguistic, political, religious and cultural homogeneous patterns are the most dependable evidences of establishing descent and biological connections.

All Yakurr people share a common tradition of overland migration and ancestry. The ancestral homeland of the Yakurr people is "Akpa", said to be a shortened form of "Lẹkanakpakpa". This area is believed to correspond with the Cameroon–Obudu range as it stands today. The Yakurr cites the Okuni, Nsofan and Ojo people as their neighbours at Lẹkanakpakpa. The traditions of Okuni, Nsofan and Ojo corroborate the Yakurr claim of having lived together at Lẹkanakpakpa, which is referred to as “Onugi” by the Okuni and Nsofan people and Lẹkpamkpa by the Ojo people.

The migration of Yakurr from their ancestral homeland started at about AD 1617, when a misunderstanding between the Yakurr and their neighbours, arising from the violation of a burial custom forced their neighbours to wage a war against them, leading to them being driven from their homeland.

The migratory history of the Yakurr people, as given by Ubi (1986 and 1978) is that, between 1617 and 1677, the Yakurr migrated from that ancestral homeland to look for a new homeland following a military defeat from Akpa. About A.D. 1660, some Yakurr migrants founded new homelands in their present locations. These locations are Idomi and Ugep. Between 1677 and 1707, some other Yakurr migrants founded the towns of Ekori and Nko. Between 1707 and 1737 yet another wave of Yakurr migrants founded Mkpani settlement.

The reasons for the relocation of populations in new settlements by the Yakurr is mainly due to competing demands for land resources, as a result of growing populations in one hand and unresolved conflicts in the other. This development is aided by the patrilocality of marriages and strong patriarchy in the family system. It was thus easy for patriclans to relocate to new settlements. This has produced a slight parallelism in names of patriclans and strong parallelism in names of matriclans in all the Yakurr settlements.

Culture

Notable people 
 Okoi Arikpo, Longest-serving Foreign Minister of the Federal Republic of Nigeria, & Pioneer Secretary, National Universities Commission. 
 Clement Ebri, former Governor of Cross River State.
 Eteng Okoi-Obuli, Minister of Agriculture, Second Republic. 
 Ibok-Ete Ekwe Ibas, Vice Admiral, and Former Chief of Naval Staff
 Usani Uguru Usani, Former Minister of Niger Delta.
 Etowa Eyong Arikpo, Former Attorney General, and Chief Justice of Cross River State
 Okoi Ikpi Itam, Former Chief Justice of Cross River State.
 Eka Ikpi Braide, Pioneer Vice-Chancellor, Cross River University of Science & Technology, and Federal University of Lafia, Nassarawa
 Efa Iwara, Nigerian actor and rapper

References
Crabb, D. W. (1969) Ekoi Bantu Languages of Ogoja, Oxford University Press, London.

Enang, S. B. (1980) Mkpani Pre-Colonial History, University of Calabar B. A. History Project.
Hansford, K.; Bendor-Samuel, J. and Stanford, R. (eds.) (1976) Studies in Nigerian Languages, Summer Institute of Linguistics, Accra.
Iwara, A. U. (1988) Reading and Writing Lokạạ, Institute of African Studies University of Ibadan, Ibadan.

Okoi-Uyouyo, M. (2002) Yakurr Systems of Kinship, Family and Marriage, Bookman, Calabar.
Ubi, O. A. (1986) “Analysis of Two Bronzes from a Nigerian Asunaju Shrine: A Rejoinder” Africana Marburgensia xix, pp. 7–8.
Ubi, O. A. (1978) The Yakurr: A Reconstruction of Pre-colonial History, University of Lagos PhD History Thesis.
Yakurr News Latest info about Yakurr People.

Further reading
Forde, D. (1939) "Kinship in Umor” American Anthropologist, Vol. 41, pp. 530–540.
Forde, D. (1950) "Double Descent Among the Yakö” in Radcliffe-Brown, A. R. and Forde, D. (eds.) African Systems of Kinship and Marriage, Oxford University Press, London.
Forde, D. (1964) Yakö Studies, Oxford University Press, London.

Geography of Nigeria
Cross River State
Ethnic groups in Nigeria